John Michael Fearns (June 25, 1897 – July 4, 1977) was an American clergyman of the Roman Catholic Church. He served as an auxiliary bishop of the Archdiocese of New York from 1957 to 1972.

Biography
John Fearns was born in New York City, and received his early education at Cathedral College in his native city. He attended St. Joseph's Seminary in Yonkers, and continued his studies in Rome at the Pontifical North American College. He earned a Doctor of Sacred Theology degree after completing his studies at the University of the Propaganda and the Pontifical Gregorian University. He was ordained to the priesthood in Rome on February 19, 1922.

After his ordination, Fearns returned to the United States and worked as a curate in New Rochelle, Rye, and St. Clare's School in Mount Hope. He served as a professor of moral theology and canon law at St. Joseph's Seminary from 1930 to 1940. In 1940, he was named to succeed Msgr. Arthur J. Scanlan as rector of St. Joseph's Seminary. He continued to serve as rector until 1956, when he became pastor of St. Francis de Sales Church.

On November 4, 1957, Fearns was appointed auxiliary bishop of the Archdiocese of New York and titular bishop of Geras by Pope Pius XII. He received his episcopal consecration on the following December 10 from Cardinal Francis Spellman, with Archbishop Patrick O'Boyle and Bishop Edward Joseph Maginn serving as co-consecrators, at St. Patrick's Cathedral. At his consecration, he wore the same vestments worn by Cardinal Spellman and Pope Pius XII at their own consecrations. In addition to his role at St. Francis, his duties included administrative affairs, presiding at confirmation and ordination ceremonies, and visitation.

Between 1962 and 1965, Fearns attended all four sessions of the Second Vatican Council. He once declared it would be immoral for any country, including the United States, to conduct nuclear tests in the atmosphere merely as a show of force, saying, "The justification of a given test depends on the importance of the new knowledge or practice that the test is expected to supply, balanced against the damage that the test will probably cause." In 1966, he was named to the newly created office of Episcopal Vicar for Orange and Rockland Counties. In an administrative innovation that resulted from the Second Vatican Council, he was one of six bishops appointed to devote more attention to the needs of local churches throughout the Archdiocese. In a move towards decentralization, the bishops were given authority to rule on issues such as the undertaking of interfaith activities with non-Catholic churches that had before been the prerogative of the Archbishop's office. He later served as pastor of St. Patrick's Church in Newburgh until his retirement on August 12, 1972.

Fearns died at St. Vincent's Hospital after a long illness, at age 80.

References

1897 births
1977 deaths
Clergy from New York City
Participants in the Second Vatican Council
20th-century American Roman Catholic titular bishops
Saint Joseph's Seminary (Dunwoodie) alumni
Roman Catholic titular bishops of Geras